James or Jim Kirkpatrick may refer to:

Political people
James C. Kirkpatrick (1905–1997), American politician, Secretary of State of Missouri (1965–1985)
James Achilles Kirkpatrick (1764–1805), British Resident in Hyderabad from 1798 to 1805
Jim Kirkpatrick (Northern Ireland politician), Unionist politician in Northern Ireland
Jim Kirkpatrick (Illinois politician), member of the Illinois House of Representatives
James J. Kilpatrick (1920–2010), American newspaper journalist and columnist

Sportsmen
Sir James Kirkpatrick, 8th Baronet (1841–1899), appeared in the 1878 FA Cup Final
James Kirkpatrick (field hockey) (born 1991), Canadian field hockey player
Jimmy Kirkpatrick, footballer who played for Plymouth Argyle in the 1910s and 1920s
Jim Kirkpatrick (footballer) (1903–?), Scottish footballer, played for Leeds United and Watford in 1920s

Others
Sir James Kirkpatrick, 4th Baronet (died 1804), of the Kirkpatrick baronets
Sir James Kirkpatrick, 10th Baronet (1918–1954), of the Kirkpatrick baronets

See also
Kirkpatrick (disambiguation)